The Nevada Division of Child and Family Services (DCFS) is a state agency of Nevada, headquartered on the third floor of the 4126 Technology Way building in Carson City.

Juvenile Justice Services
The Juvenile Justice Services division operates juvenile correctional facilities. The division's administrative offices are in Las Vegas.

The Caliente Youth Center, serving boys and girls, is located in Caliente. The Nevada Youth Training Center, serving boys, is located in unincorporated Elko County, near Elko.

References

External links

 Nevada Division of Child and Family Services

State agencies of Nevada
Juvenile detention centers in the United States
State corrections departments of the United States